Fieldon King Alexander is an American former university administrator and professor of higher education policy and finance. He was the president of Oregon State University, Louisiana State University, California State University, Long Beach, and Murray State University. He resigned from his most recent position as President of Oregon State University in 2021 after a faculty vote of no-confidence.

Early life and career
Alexander is in the Boy's and Girl's Club Hall of Fame.

Alexander received a bachelor's degree in political science from St. Lawrence University. After completing his master's degree at Oxford, Alexander worked as Coordinator of External Programs and then as Director of Annual Giving at the University of North Carolina at Greensboro prior to pursuing his Ph.D. at the University of Wisconsin-Madison.

University presidencies

Murray State University
Alexander served as the 10th president of Murray State University in Kentucky from 2001 to 2005, his predecessor being his father Kern Alexander. Murray State's faculty senate passed a resolution condemning the closed process behind his appointment by the university's board of regents, which had named itself as the search committee. As president, Alexander improved the relationship between faculty and the administration and oversaw the construction or renovation of several campus buildings, including the Alexander Hall Education Building and the Susan E. Bauernfeind Student Recreation and Wellness Center.

Alexander was invited to testify to the U.S. House of Representatives subcommittee on 21st Century Competitiveness in the 108th Congress in 2003.

Alexander was a Foundation Fellow at Harris Manchester College and a faculty affiliate at the University of Illinois and Cornell University.

California State University, Long Beach

F. King Alexander was appointed as president of California State University, Long Beach in 2006. During his time at CSULB, a new $70 million Student Recreation Wellness Center was completed along with a $110 million Hall of Science building.   On May 15, 2013, the California Conference for Equality and Justice presented him with the Humanitarian Award. Cal State Long Beach's focus on improving graduation numbers and rates for all student populations, especially from underrepresented populations, gained national attention. Alexander was an original signatory to the Long Beach College Promise. Alexander was invited to testify to the U.S. House of Representatives hearing on "Barriers to Equal Educational Opportunities: Addressing the Rising Costs of a College Education" (November 1, 2007). The Committee on Education and Labor, U.S. House of Representatives, 110th Congress. For his efforts in supporting students access, success and improved student aid programs, Alexander was selected by the California State University Student Association as California State University President of the Year in 2009–10.

Louisiana State University

It was announced on March 27, 2013, that Alexander would become president of the LSU system and chancellor of Louisiana State University A&M effective July 1, 2013. Some criticism occurred over the way the Louisiana State University Board of Supervisors had conducted its search to fill the position of president of LSU after John V. Lombardi had been fired from it under alleged influence by Governor Bobby Jindal and as Alexander was named the sole finalist for president of LSU. The decision was met with a unanimously negative vote of confidence by LSU's faculty senate against the LSU Board of Supervisors, but Board of Supervisors chair Hank Danos asserted that Alexander "was clearly the right guy for LSU." The Faculty Senate's vote of no confidence in Alexander's hiring noted that Alexander had never been a tenured full professor at a major research university and that the graduation rates at CSULB were lower than those at LSU.

Oregon State University
Alexander was elected to become President of Oregon State University on December 13, 2019, by the Oregon State University Board of Trustees. He assumed office on July 1, 2020.

On March 18, 2021, the Faculty Senate of Oregon State University declared no confidence in Alexander's leadership and demanded he resign in response to revelations about his role in lax enforcement of sexual misconduct at LSU. The Faculty Senate held a plebiscite of all Oregon State faculty from March 19 to March 22, 2021, on the statement, "The Faculty of Oregon State University has no confidence in President Alexander's ability to lead OSU in a way that is consistent with our values, and calls upon him to resign." The statement was approved by 83% of those voting, with a response rate of 39.4%.

Alexander resigned from OSU presidency on March 23, 2021, for mishandling sexual misconduct allegations at LSU during his tenure as chancellor and president from 2013 to 2019. His offer to resign was unanimously accepted by the board of trustees who said that they were convinced that the change was necessary due to outpouring of opposition and concern from OSU faculty and students. He is to be paid $630,000 (equivalent to one year's salary) and $40,000 for "relocation assistance".

Personal life
Alexander's first wife, Elizabeth Williams Alexander, died of breast cancer in 2000. In 2006 he married Shenette (Campbell) Alexander.

Publications
2015. Financing Public Schools: Theory, Policy and Practice. Co-authored with Richard G. Salmon, publisher Routledge, Taylor & Francis Group, London. 
2003. F. King Alexander and Ronald G. Ehrenberg (eds). Maximizing Revenue in Higher Education. San Francisco: Jossey-Bass.
2002. The University: International Expectations. McGill-Queen's University Press.
1998. Residential Colleges: Reforming American Higher Education, co-edited with Don E. Robertson, Oxford International Round Table, 1998.

References

Living people
Alumni of St Peter's College, Oxford
Leaders of Louisiana State University
Presidents of Oregon State University
Oregon State University people
Presidents of Louisiana State University system
Presidents of California State University, Long Beach
Presidents of Murray State University
St. Lawrence University alumni
University of Wisconsin–Madison School of Education alumni
People from Louisville, Kentucky
Year of birth missing (living people)